Altaff Ali Mungrue (25 August 1934 – 11 December 2015) was a Trinidadian-born English first-class cricketer and Royal Air Force airman.

Mungrue was born at Port of Spain and later emigrated to England, where he enlisted in the Royal Air Force (RAF). While serving in the RAF, Mungrue played  first-class cricket for the Combined Services cricket team in 1964, making two appearances against Cambridge University at Uxbridge, and Oxford University at Aldershot. He scored 102 runs in these two matches, with a high score of 51, which came against Cambridge University. With his mixture of right-arm off break and medium pace bowling, Mungrue took 8 wickets at 16.12 in these two matches, with best figures of 4 for 58. He played minor matches while serving in both Singapore and Malaya in 1960–61.

Altaff died in December 2015 at Maidenhead, Berkshire.

References

External links

1934 births
2015 deaths
Cricketers from Port of Spain
Trinidad and Tobago emigrants to the United Kingdom
English people of Trinidad and Tobago descent
Royal Air Force airmen
English cricketers
Combined Services cricketers